"A Red Letter Day" is a song by English synth-pop duo Pet Shop Boys, released on 17 March 1997 as the fourth single from their sixth studio album, Bilingual (1996). The single peaked at number 9 on the UK Singles Chart, making it another top 10 single for the group. However, it then fell straight out of the UK top 40 (to number 42) the following week. At the time, this was a record as the biggest such fall to ever occur in UK chart history, but it was then beaten the following year by Embrace with their single "My Weakness Is None of Your Business" (which fell from number 9 to 44 the following week).

The duo were admirers of the sound of Motiv8, who had remixed various other artists at the time. Neil Tennant asked the man behind Motiv8 (Steve Rodway) to remix this single, even visiting Rodway at work in his studio during the remix. After it was finished and delivered, Tennant insisted that a synth line, which Rodway had come up with on the Motiv8 version, should be used on the Pet Shop Boys' own main mix. After unsuccessful attempts to recreate Rodway's riff, it eventually had to be sampled from the Motiv8 mix. Thus, as well as appearing on the Motiv8 remix, it appears on the Pet Shop Boys' main version.

Critical reception
Dominic Pride from Music & Media wrote, "The fourth single from the Bilingual album is more of a by-numbers affair than previous singles Bilingual and Se A Vida E, which relied on epic off-beat percussion for their appeal. It's a formula which has resulted in continent-wide hits for Tennant & Lowe before—their understated use of strings and simple club rhythms has been the defining sound of Europe for much of the last decade. Strangely, the hook comes on the first part of the chorus, leading many to think this is called All I Want."

Track listings
 UK CD single 1 (CDR 6460)
 "A Red Letter Day"
 "The Boy Who Couldn't Keep His Clothes On"
 "Delusions of Grandeur"
 "A Red Letter Day" (Moscow Mix)

 UK CD single 2 (CDRS 6460)
 "A Red Letter Day" (Trouser Enthusiasts Autoerotic Decapitation Mix)
 "A Red Letter Day" (Motiv 8 Twelve Inch Master Mix)
 "A Red Letter Day" (Basement Jaxx Vocal Mix)
 "A Red Letter Day" (PSB Extended Edit)
 "A Red Letter Day" (Trouser Enthusiasts Congo Dongo Dubstramental)

 UK cassette single (TCR6452)
 "A Red Letter Day"
 "The Boy Who Couldn't Keep His Clothes On"

Charts

References

1995 songs
1997 singles
LGBT-related songs
Music videos directed by Howard Greenhalgh
Parlophone singles
Pet Shop Boys songs
Songs written by Chris Lowe
Songs written by Neil Tennant